James F. Ports Jr. was a member of the Maryland House of Delegates, representing District 8, which covered portions of Baltimore & Baltimore City in Maryland.  He served alongside Democrat Katherine A. Klausmeier and Republican Alfred W. Redmer Jr.  In 2002, Ports decided against running for reelection in the House of Delegates and decided instead to run for Baltimore County Council.  He won the Republican primary election, but lost in the general election to Vincent J. Gardina.

Education
Delegate Ports graduated from Perry Hall High School. After serving in the Marine Corps, Ports attended and graduated from Essex Community College, with his Associates of Arts Degree in 1989.

Career
As previously mentioned Ports was in the United States Marine Corps.  He attained the rank of Sergeant, and once received the Expeditionary Medal for Marine of the Month.  He served from 1978 until 1982.

After serving in the military, Ports was a supervisor of Industrial and Commercial Gas Field Operations for Baltimore Gas and Electric Company. He is also licensed as a registered representative by the Financial Industry Regulatory Authority as an insurance agent.

In his community he served as Vice-President of the Northeast Fullerton Community Association, which he was a member from 1986 until 1990. He has been a member of the 8th District Republican Club since 1988. Ports was a member of the Baltimore County Republican Central Committee, serving from 1989 until 1990 and again from 2003 until 2006. He was once elected to be a delegate for the 2000 Republican Party National Convention.

Delegate Ports also is a member of the Rossville Democratic Association, the Taxpayers for Government Efficiency, the Essex Community College Alumni Association.  Additionally, he is a member of the Competent Toastmasters, and the Phi Theta Kappa honorary fraternity. Delegate Ports is also an associate member of Lodge no. 76, of the Fraternal Order of Police.  He was the Commander of the Perry Hall/White Marsh Post no. 11378, Veterans of Foreign Wars (VFW) from 1992 until 1994.  He is a life member of the Parkville Memorial Post no. 9083. Finally, he is an honorary co-chair and co-founder of the Perry Hall High School Alumni Association.

Delegate Ports has received awards from People Against Child Abuse, the Maryland School for the Blind, the Baltimore County Police Department, and the Tall Cedars of Lebanon. In 1996, Delegate Ports was selected as Outstanding Young Marylander of the Year by the Maryland Jaycees. Additionally, he received the General James P. S. Devereux Award from the Maryland Society of the Sons of the American Revolution in 1997. Finally, Ports was awarded Legislator of the Year by the American Legislative Exchange Council (ALEC) in 2001.

Legislative career
While a member of the Maryland House of Delegates, Ports was a member of the Constitutional and Administrative Law Committee from  1991 until 1992, the Ways and Means Committee from 1992 until 2003, the Joint Transportation Financing Committee in 1994, and the Special Joint Committee on Competitive Taxation and Economic Development from 1996 until 1997.  Additionally, he served on the Joint Committee on the Selection of the State Treasurer in 2002, the Legislative Policy Committee from 2002 until 2003, and the Rules and Executive Nominations Committee from 2002 until 2003. Delegate Ports was also a member of the National Task Force on Energy, Environment, and Natural Resources, and with ALEC from 1991 until 2003, serving as vice-chair of the energy subcommittee.

Delegate Ports originally made a name for himself when he fought against Baltimore County Executive C.A. Dutch Ruppersberger's property condemnation bill, which was ultimately defeated.  The bill would have allowed the county to use eminent domain to seize waterfront property in Essex and redevelop it.

Election results
1998 Race for Maryland House of Delegates – District 08
Voters to choose three:
{| class="wikitable"
|-
!Name
!Votes
!Percent
!Outcome
|-
|-
|Katherine Klausmeier, Dem.
|19,835
|  21%
|   Won
|-
|-
|Alfred W. Redmer Jr., Rep
|17,846
|  19%
|   Won
|-
|-
|James F. Ports Jr., Rep.
|17,756
|  19%
|   Won
|-
|-
|J. Joseph Curran III, Dem.
|17,583
|  19%
|   Lost
|-
|- 
|Joseph C. Boteler III, Rep.
|11,306
|  12%
|   Lost
|-
|-
|Taras Andrew Vizzi, Dem.
|9,927
|  11%
|   Lost
|-
|}

1994 Race for Maryland House of Delegates – District 08
Voters to choose three:
{| class="wikitable"
|-
!Name
!Votes
!Percent
!Outcome
|-
|-
|Katherine Klausmeier, Dem.
|17,496
|  20%
|   Won
|-
|- 
|Alfred W. Redmer Jr., Rep.
|14,876
|  18%
|   Won
|-
|-
|James F. Ports Jr., Rep.
|15,244
|  17%
|   Won
|-
|-
|Calvin Clemons, Rep.
|13,996
|  16%
|   Lost
|-
|-
|Daniel E. McKew, Dem.
|12,931
|  15%
|   Lost
|-
|-
|John G. Disney, Dem.
|11,886
|  14%
|   Lost
|-
|}

1990 Race for Maryland House of Delegates – District 08
Voters to choose three:
{| class="wikitable"
|-
!Name
!Votes
!Percent
!Outcome
|-
|-
|Alfred W. Redmer Jr., Rep.
|15,354
|  18%
|   Won
|-
|- 
|Joseph Bartenfelder, Dem.
|14,876
|  18%
|   Won
|-
|-
|James F. Ports, Rep.
|14,266
|  17%
|   Won
|-
|-
|Kenneth G. Hirsch, Rep.
|14,129
|  17%
|   Lost
|-
|-
|Donna M. Felling, Dem.
|13,006
|  15%
|   Lost
|-
|-
|William J. Burgess, Dem.
|12,680
|  15%
|   Lost
|-
|-
|John Michael Fleig
|20
|  0%
|   Lost
|-
|}

See also

References and notes

External links
Maryland Manual
American Legislative Exchange Council Award

People from Baltimore County, Maryland
Republican Party members of the Maryland House of Delegates
Living people
1958 births
United States Marines